Sign is 2011 South Korean television series, starring Park Shin-yang, Kim Ah-joong, Jun Kwang-ryul, Jung Gyu-woon and Uhm Ji-won. It is about the life of forensic doctors. It aired on SBS from January 6 to March 10, 2011 on Wednesdays and Thursdays at 21:55 for 20 episodes.

Synopsis
The story details the partnership between Go Da-kyung (Kim Ah-joong), a warm-hearted rookie and Yoon Ji-hoon (Park Shin-yang), a high-tempered forensic doctor, who find themselves an unlikely pair for solving cases.

Cast
Park Shin-yang as Yoon Ji-hoon  
Kim Ah-joong as Go Da-kyung
Uhm Ji-won as Jung Woo-jin 
Jung Gyu-woon as Choi Yi-han 
Jun Kwang-ryul as Lee Myung-han 
Song Jae-ho as Jung Byung-do 
Jang Hyun-sung as Jang Min-suk 
Ahn Moon-sook as Hong Sook-joo 
Jung Eun-pyo as Kim Wan-tae 
Im Ho-gul as Jang Jae-young 
Moon Chun-shik as Ahn Sung-jin 
Kwon Byung-gil as Goo Sung-tae 
Lee Jung-hun as Joo In-hyuk 
Kim Kyung-bum as Park Tae-gyu 
Jung Seung-ho as Go Kang-shik 
Kim Young-sun as Jung Eun-mo 
Hwang Sun-hee as Kang Seo-yeon 
Park Young-ji as Kang Joon-hyuk 
Kim Eung-soo as Chief prosecutor Choi Jung-seop
Yoo Se-rye as Mi-young 
Park Geon-il as Seo Yoon-hyung
Kim Han-joon as Kang Yong-hwa 
Oh Hyun-chul as Woo Jae-won 
Supernova as VOICE (cameo) 
Jung Yoon-hak as Boy Band "VOICE" member	
Jung Ji-yoon as Secretary for lead prosecutor
Choi Jae-hwan as Ahn Soo-hyun (ep 4-7) 
Han Bo-bae as Aki-chan (ep 8) 
Kim Sung-won as school principal (ep 8) 
Kim Jung-tae as Jung Cha-young (ep 11-13) 
Baek Seung-hyeon as Lee Chul-won (ep 12-13) 
Jung Da-bin as Da-bin (ep 13-14) 
Kim Dan-yool as village kid (ep 13-14) 
Yoon Joo-sang as Jung Moon-soo (cameo) 
Kim Sung-oh as Lee Ho-jin (cameo, ep 15-19) 
Kim Min-kyo as policeperson (cameo, ep 1)
Maxine Koo as Chinese CBC reporter (cameo) 
Jang Hang-jun as side table guest (cameo) 
Yang Taek-jo (cameo) 
Jung Mi-jung
Im Seung-dae

International Broadcast
Indosiar (2012)
RCTI (2015)
NET. (2022–present)

Awards and nominations

Japanese remake
A Japanese remake titled Sign: Houigakusha Yuzuki Takashi no Jiken (サイン―法医学者 柚木貴志の事件―) will air on TV Asahi in July 2019. It is produced by Total Media Communication.

References

External links
 Sign official SBS website 
 
 

Seoul Broadcasting System television dramas
Korean-language television shows
2011 South Korean television series debuts
2011 South Korean television series endings
South Korean crime television series
Television shows written by Kim Eun-hee